Konami GX is an arcade system board introduced in 1994 by Konami.

List of Konami GX games 
 Dice-Kiss (1996)
 Dragoon Might (1995)
 Fantastic Parodius - Pursue the Glory of the Past (1994)
 Golfing Greats 2 (1994)
 Lethal Enforcers II: Gun Fighters (1994)
 Racin' Force (1994)
 Run And Gun 2 (1996)
 Rushing Heroes (1997)
 Salamander 2  (1996)
 Sexy Parodius (1996)
 Soccer Superstars (1995)
 Taisen Puzzle-dama (1994)
 Tokimeki Memorial Taisen Puzzle-Dama (1995)
 Tokkae Puzzle-dama (1996)
 TwinBee Yahho! (1995)
 Vs. Net Soccer (1996)
 Winning Spike (1997)

References

Konami arcade system boards
68k-based arcade system boards